The Riviera International Film Festival (RIFF) is an annual film festival held in Sestri Levante, Italy, which previews new films of various genres from around the world. The invitation-only festival is held annually at the end of April/beginning of May and was founded in 2016 by Los Angeles-based film producer Stefano Gallini-Durante. The festival's Official Competition is reserved for carefully selected works by directors under 35 and for feature documentaries on the Environment and Climate Change.

Jury
An international jury composed of a president and various film, culture, and art personalities, who determine the prizes for the feature films in the competition.

Selection

2019

2018

2017
It's Only the End of the World (Dir. Xavier Dolan; Producers Xavier Dolan, Sylvain Corbell, Nancy Grant, Elisha Karmitz, Nathanael Karmitz, Michel Merkt; Cast Nathalie Baye, Marion Cotillard, Vincent Cassel, Léa Seydoux, Gaspard Ulliel)
Embrace of the Serpent(Dir. Ciro Guerra; Producer Cristina Gallego; Cast Nilbio Torres, Jan Bijvoet, Antonio Bolivar, Brionne Davis)
Autumn Lights (Dir. Angad Aulakh; Producers Guy Kent, Angad Aulakh, Ashley M. Kent, David Oskar Olafsson, Arni Filippusson; Cast Guy Kent, Marta Gastini)
Sami Blood (Dir. Amanda Kernell; Producer Lars G. Lindstrom; Cast Lene Cecilia Sparrok, Mia Sparrok, Maj Doris Rimpi, Olle Sarri)
Marija (Dir. Michael Koch; Producers Christoph Friedel, Claudia Steffen; Cast Margarita Breitkreiz, Georg Friedrich, Sahin Eryilmaz)
Baden Baden (Dir. Rachel Lang; Producers Valérie Bournonville, Pierre-Louis Cassou, Jeremy Forn, Joseph Rouschop; Cast Salome Richard, Claude Gensac, Lazare Gousseau)
I Was a Dreamer (Dir. Michele Vannucci; Producer Giovanni Pompilli; Cast Mirko Frezza, Alessandro Borghi, Vittorio Viviani)
As I Open My Eyes (Dir. Leyla Bouzid; Producers Sandra da Fonesca, Imed Marzouk; Cast Baya Medhaffer, Ghalia Benali, Montassar Ayari)
Our Last (Dir. Ludovico di Martino; Producers Alessandro Amato, Ludovico Di Martini, Gabriele Luppi; Cast Fabrizio Colica, Guglielmo Poggi, Giobbe Covatta)
Out of Love (Dir. Paloma Aguilera; Producers Arnold Heslenfeld, Laurette Schillings, Frans Van Gestel; Cast Naomi Velissariou, Daniil Vorobyev)

Awards

In competition
2017 Winners
 Grand Jury Prize for Best Picture – Embrace of the Serpent by Ciro Guerra
 Jury Prize for Best Director – Amanda Kernell for Sami Blood Jury Prize for Best Actor – Daniil Varobyov for Out of Love Jury Prize for Best Actress – Baya Medhaffer for As I Open My Eyes Special Mention Award – Baden Baden2017 Nominees
 Best Director
 Xavier Dolan for It's Only the End of the World Ciro Guerra for Embrace of the Serpent Angad Aulakh for Autumn Lights Michael Koch for Marija Rachel Lang for Baden Baden Michel Vannucci for I Was A Dreamer Leyla Bouzid for As I Open My Eyes Ludovico di Martino for Our Last Paloma Aguilera for Out of Love Best Actress
 Nathalie Baye for It's Only the End of the World Léa Seydoux for It's Only the End of the World Marion Cotillard for It's Only the End of the World Marta Gastini for Autumn Lights Lene Cecilia Sparrok for Sami Blood Margarita Breitkreiz for Marija Salomé Richard for Baden Baden Mia Erika Sparrok for Sami Blood Naomi Velissariou for Out of Love Best Actor
 Vincent Cassel for It's Only the End of the World Gaspard Ulliel for It's Only the End of the World Guy Kent for Autumn Lights Olle Sarri for Sami Blood Georg Friedrich for Marija Mirko Frezzo for Our Last Lazare Gousseau for Baden Baden Ayari Montassar for As I Open My Eyes Fabrizio Colica for Our Last''

See also

 Venice Biennale
 Venice Film Festival
 Cannes Film Festival
 Berlin International Film Festival

References

External links

 Riviera International Film Festival – Official Website 
 Official Facebook
 

2016 establishments in Italy
Film festivals established in 2016
Film festivals in Italy